Tone Tangen Myrvoll (born 12 May 1965) is a former Norwegian deaf cross-country skier, orienteer and runner. She has represented Norway in both Summer and Winter Deaflympics from 1985 to 2003 on seven occasions. She has competed at the Summer Deaflympics in 1985 and in 1989 and competed at the Winter Deaflympics in 1987, 1991, 1995, 1999 and in 2003. Tone Tangen Myrvoll initially started her career as orienteer before pursuing her career in cross country skiing. She is regarded as the most successful cross country skier in Deaflympic history with a medal tally of 15 including 11 gold medals. She is also the most successful athlete from Norway to compete at the Deaflympics.

Career 
Tone Tangen Myrvoll is profoundly deaf and was eligible to compete at the 1988 European Orienteering Championships among the non deaf athletes. She made her Deaflympic debut during the 1985 Summer Deaflympics and claimed a solitary bronze medal in the women's 1500m event. She also took part at the 1989 Summer Deaflympics and went medalless.

She took up the sport of cross country skiing in 1987 and went onto make her Winter Deaflympics debut in the 1987 edition which was held in her hometown Oslo, capital of Norway. She clinched three medals during the event including two gold medals in women's 5 km and 10 km categories along with a bronze in women's 3×5 km relay event. Following the successful maiden appearance, she went onto dominate in the Winter Deaflympics until the 2003 edition and finished her career with 15 Winter Deaflympic medals and a solitary Summer Deaflympic bronze medal. She was awarded the ICSD Deaf Sportswoman of the Year in 1998 and was nominated for the relevant award on five occasions.

Cross-country skiing results
All results are sourced from the International Ski Federation (FIS).

World Cup

Season standings

References 

1965 births
Living people
Skiers from Oslo
Norwegian female cross-country skiers
Norwegian orienteers
Female orienteers
Norwegian female middle-distance runners
Deaf skiers
Norwegian deaf people
Deaf competitors in athletics
Deaflympic cross-country skiers of Norway
Deaflympic gold medalists for Norway
Deaflympic silver medalists for Norway
Deaflympic bronze medalists for Norway
Deaflympic athletes of Norway
20th-century Norwegian women
21st-century Norwegian women